Polynucleobacter yangtzensis is an aerobic, chemo-organotrophic, catalase- and oxidase-positive, sometimes motile, free-living bacterium of the genus Polynucleobacter, isolated from Yangtze River in the City of Nanjing (China). The species represents planktonic bacteria (bacterioplankton) dwelling in alkaline freshwater systems. The species name refers to the origin of the type strain.

References

External links
Type strain of Polynucleobacter yangtzensis at BacDive -  the Bacterial Diversity Metadatabase

Burkholderiaceae
Bacteria described in 2016